Susanne Wollschläger (born May 5, 1967 in Duisburg, Nordrhein-Westfalen) is a former field hockey goalkeeper from Germany, who was a member of the Women's National Team that won the silver medal at the 1992 Summer Olympics in Barcelona, Spain. She competed in three consecutive Summer Olympics, starting in 1988 (Seoul, South Korea) for West Germany.

References
 databaseOlympics
 sports-reference

External links
 

1967 births
Living people
German female field hockey players
Female field hockey goalkeepers
Field hockey players at the 1988 Summer Olympics
Field hockey players at the 1992 Summer Olympics
Field hockey players at the 1996 Summer Olympics
Olympic field hockey players of Germany
Olympic silver medalists for Germany
Sportspeople from Duisburg
Place of birth missing (living people)
Olympic medalists in field hockey
Medalists at the 1992 Summer Olympics
20th-century German women